The Archdeacon of Caithness was the only archdeacon in the Diocese of Caithness, acting as a deputy of the Bishop of Caithness. The following is a list of known historical archdeacons:

List of archdeacons of Caithness
 John, fl. 1296
 Fercard Belegaumbe, fl. 1297-1304 x
 Andrew de Hirdmaniston, fl. 1328-1329
 John Todd, fl. 1329
 William de Forres, fl. 1355
 John de Lancford, 1358
 John de Moray, fl. 1365
 William Forrester, fl. 1382
 John de Innes, fl. 1396-1398
 Alexander Vaus, 1398-x 1407
 Alexander Barber, 1407-1419 x 1421
 Thomas de Greenlaw, 1414-1419 x 1428
 Nicholas Tunnok, 1421-1422
 Thomas Duncan, 1426
 Thomas Tulloch, 1428-1437
 James Bruce, 1437
 Laurence Piot, 1437-1440
 Alexander Rattray, 1438-1440 x 1443
 Alexander Lichton, 1440
 David Reid, 1440
 David Stewart, 1440
 James Innes, 1440-1442
 Richard Dor, 1441
 William Sutherland, 1443-1443 x 1445
 Richard Holland, 1443 x 1445-1448
 Alexander Sutherland, 1445-1477
 Hector Tulloch, 1445
 James Forrester, 1497-1498
 George Stewart, fl. 1512
 John Dingwall, 1516-1532 x 1533
 James Brady, 1525-1556
 William Gordon, 1529
 John Sinclair, 1550 x 1551-1574 x 1578
 Robert Innes, 1577-1581
 Zachary Pont, 1608
 Richard Merchiston, 1619-1626 x 1633

Notes

Bibliography
 Watt, D.E.R., Fasti Ecclesiae Scotinanae Medii Aevi ad annum 1638, 2nd Draft, (St Andrews, 1969), pp. 70–3

See also
 Bishop of Caithness

Caithness
Caithness
History of the Scottish Highlands
People associated with Highland (council area)
Sutherland